Meerit Insawang (born 5 September 1983) is a Thai diver. He competed in the men's 3 metre springboard event at the 2000 Summer Olympics.

References

External links
 

1983 births
Living people
Meerit Insawang
Meerit Insawang
Divers at the 2000 Summer Olympics
Place of birth missing (living people)
Divers at the 1998 Asian Games
Meerit Insawang